Juan José Verzeri Casas (born May 20, 1963 in Montevideo) is an Uruguayan football coach, who is currently assistant manager of São Paulo. He is nicknamed "Ingeniero" (Engineer), for his secondary profession.

Coaching career
In early 2008, he became assistant manager of Julio César Ribas at Oman for a short period of time.

In mid-2008, Verzeri took up coaching at Racing Club in the Uruguayan Primera División. He played a vital role for Racing to qualify to the 2010 edition of the Copa Libertadores. 

In May 2010, he was named the Uruguay under-20s manager. 

On 11 August 2010, he directed the Uruguay senior team on a friendly match against Angola. 

In 2011, he coached the Uruguay U22 team for the 2011 Pan American Games.

Honours
Uruguay U-20
2013 FIFA U-20 World Cup: Runner-Up
2011 South American U-20 Championship: Runner-Up

References

External links
 Profile at soccerway

1963 births
Living people
Sportspeople from Montevideo
Uruguayan football managers
Racing Club de Montevideo managers
Liverpool F.C. (Montevideo) managers
Ittihad FC managers
Uruguay national football team managers